Centennial Place may mean:

Centennial Place (Calgary)
Centennial Place (Atlanta)